"Mi sei venuto a cercare tu" is the fifth single of Alessandra Amoroso. It is the third single off her debut album of Alessandra Amoroso, Senza nuvole.

Track listing
Digital download

The song
Mi sei venuto a cercare tu is a song written by Diego Calvetti and Marco Ciappelli and produced by Adriano Pennino. It is the first single by Alessandra Amoroso which wasn't written by Federica Camba and Daniele Coro, authors of the first four singles by the singer. The song was released as the third single, and made - then - available for digital download and radio airplay on January 22, 2010, coinciding with the beginning of the Senza nuvole#Senza Nuvole Live Tour. The song, written by a new pair than the other authors of Alessandra, is a ballad characterized by a Spanish-guitar and bass in the verses, and tone rather high in the chorus. The song appears as an intense love song that allows Alessandra to fully express its voice. The song was presented for the first time, along with almost the entire album to which it belongs on 8 October 2009 at the Limelight in Milan, where Alessandra presented his live album in several movies in Italy. The song will not, however, never be performed by the singer in television. The song was also inserted in the setlist of the Senza nuvole#Un'Estate Senza Nuvole Live Tour. The song managed to achieve a good success in the radio airplay.

References

External links
 Mi sei venuto a cercare tu live @ Radio Italia Live

Alessandra Amoroso songs
2009 songs
2010 singles
Pop ballads
Italian-language songs
Songs written by Diego Calvetti
Songs written by Marco Ciappelli
Sony BMG singles